The 2021 SAFF U-19 Women's Championship was the second edition of the SAFF U-19 Women's Championship, an international football competition for women's under-19 national teams organized by SAFF. The tournament was held  from 11 to 22 December 2021 at BSSS Mostafa Kamal Stadium, Dhaka in Bangladesh.

Bangladesh is the defending champion having  defeated India 1–0
goals in the final of the tournament.

Host selection 
On 14 October 2021, SAFF members board meeting took place in Malé, Maldives, where Bangladesh was announced to be the host of the tournament.

Venue
All matches were held at the BSSS Mostafa Kamal Stadium in Dhaka, Bangladesh.

Participating nations
FIFA suspended Pakistan Football Federation on 7 April 2021, so they cannot participate in this competition. Maldives withdrew from the tournament before the fixtures were finalised.

Players eligibility
Players born on or after 1 January 2002 are eligible to compete in the tournament. Each team has to register a squad of minimum 16 players and maximum 23 players, minimum two of whom must be goalkeepers.

Match officials
Referees

 Tshering Yangkhey
 Jaya Chakma
 Rupadevi Gurusamy
 Anjana Rai
 Pabasara Minisarani

Assistant referees
 
 Salma Akter Mone
 Reshmi Thapa Chhetri
 Bina Nawachhe Shrestha
 Meera Tamang 
 Malika Madhushani

Group stage

Tiebreakers
Teams are ranked according to points (3 points for a win, 1 point for a draw, 0 points for a loss), and if tied on points, the following tiebreaking criteria are applied, in the order given, to determine the rankings.
Points in head-to-head matches among tied teams;
Goal difference in head-to-head matches among tied teams;
Goals scored in head-to-head matches among tied teams;
If more than two teams are tied, and after applying all head-to-head criteria above, a subset of teams are still tied, all head-to-head criteria above are reapplied exclusively to this subset of teams;
Goal difference in all group matches;
Goals scored in all group matches;
Penalty shoot-out if only two teams are tied and they met in the last round of the group;
Disciplinary points (yellow card = 1 point, red card as a result of two yellow cards = 3 points, direct red card = 3 points, yellow card followed by direct red card = 4 points);
Drawing of lots.

Standings

Matches

Final

Winners

Awards
The following awards were given at the conclusion of the tournament:

Statistics

Goalscorers

References

External links
Official website

2018
2021 in women's association football
2021 in Asian football
December 2021 sports events in Asia
2021 in youth association football